First Colored Baptist Church may refer to:

 First Colored Baptist Church (Bowling Green, Kentucky), listed on the NRHP in Warren County, Kentucky
 First Colored Baptist Church (Memphis, Tennessee), listed on the NRHP in Shelby County, Tennessee
 First Colored Baptist Church (San Francisco, California)